Brian McCann may refer to:

 Brian McCann (actor) (born 1965), American writer, actor, and comedian
 Brian McCann (baseball) (born 1984), baseball player

See also
 Bryan McCann (born 1987), American football player